The Long Way Home is a 1985 Australian film about two Vietnam veterans.

References

External links

Australian war drama films
1985 films
Films scored by Chris Neal (songwriter)
1980s English-language films
1980s Australian films